Simdesk, fully known as Simdesk Technologies, Inc., formerly Internet Access Technologies, was a Houston-based software as a service provider of on demand messaging and collaboration tools for business.  It was founded by Ray C. Davis in 1999. Early in the company's history, it was sold to municipal authorities.  The company began to commercially offer Simdesk direct to small businesses in March 2006. There were several Simdesk resellers, including KDDI in Japan.

Discontinuation
On May 1, 2008, Simdesk ceased operations, terminating retail hosted services for SMB and individual customers in the United States and Latin America.  It was announced that externally hosted services based on Simdesk's platform license would remain in place.  (As of 2009, the URLs have gone dark.) Its future direction has not been announced.

References

External links 
 Simdesk homepage
 Cache of the Simdesk homepage
 KDDI Secure Share
 Simdesk at Startup Houston
 Simdesk: No comment
 BlogHouston
Companies established in 1999
Defunct software companies of the United States
Companies disestablished in 2008
Companies based in Houston